Iris Corniani (born 3 December 1958) is an Italian former swimmer. She competed in two events at the 1976 Summer Olympics.

References

External links
 

1958 births
Living people
Italian female swimmers
Olympic swimmers of Italy
Swimmers at the 1976 Summer Olympics
Sportspeople from Mantua
Mediterranean Games silver medalists for Italy
Mediterranean Games medalists in swimming
Swimmers at the 1975 Mediterranean Games
20th-century Italian women